The Ukrainian diaspora comprises Ukrainians and their descendants who live outside Ukraine around the world, especially those who maintain some kind of connection, even if ephemeral, to the land of their ancestors and maintain their feeling of Ukrainian national identity within their own local community. The Ukrainian diaspora is found throughout numerous regions worldwide including other post-Soviet states as well as in other countries such as Poland, the United States, Canada, the UK and Brazil.

Distribution 

The Ukrainian diaspora is found throughout numerous countries worldwide. It is particularly concentrated in other post-Soviet states (Belarus, Kazakhstan, Moldova, and Russia), Central Europe (the Czech Republic, Germany, and Poland), North America (Canada and the United States), and South America (Argentina and Brazil).

History

1608 to 1880 

After the loss suffered by the Ukrainian-Swedish Alliance under Ivan Mazepa in the Battle of Poltava in 1709, some political emigrants, primarily Cossacks, settled in Turkey and in Western Europe.

In 1775, after the fall of the Zaporozhian Sich to the Russian Empire, some more Cossacks emigrated to Dobruja in the Ottoman Empire (now in Romania), while others settled in Volga and Ural regions of the Russian Empire.

In the second half of the 18th century, Ukrainians from the Transcarpathian Region formed agricultural settlements in the Kingdom of Hungary, primarily in the Bačka and Syrmia regions. Both are now located in the Vojvodina Region of the Republic of Serbia.

In time, Ukrainian settlements emerged in the major European capitals, including Vienna, Budapest, Rome and Warsaw.

In 1880, the Ukrainian diaspora consisted of approximately 1.2 million people, which represented approximately 4.6% of all Ukrainians, and was distributed as follows:

0.7 million in the European part of the Russian Empire
0.2 million in Austro-Hungary
0.1 million in the Asian part of the Russian Empire
0.1 million in the United States

1880–1920 

In the last quarter of the 19th century due to the agrarian resettlement, a massive emigration of Ukrainians from Austro-Hungary to the Americas and from the Russian Empire to the Urals and Asia (Siberia and Kazakhstan) occurred.

A secondary movement was the emigration under the auspices of the Austro-Hungarian government of 10,000 Ukrainians from Galicia to Bosnia.

Furthermore, due to Russian agitation, 15,000 Ukrainians left Galicia and Bukovina and settled in Russia. Most of these settlers later returned.

Finally in the Russian Empire, some Ukrainians from the Chełm and Podlaskie regions, as well as most of the Jews, emigrated to the Americas.

Some of those who left their homeland returned. For example, from the 393,000 Ukrainians who emigrated to the United States of America, 70,000 returned.

Most of the emigrants to the United States of America worked in the construction and mining industries. Many worked in the US on a temporary basis, to earn remittances.

In the 1890s, Ukrainian agricultural settlers emigrated to first to Brazil, and Argentina. However, the writings of Galician professor and nationalist Dr. Joseph Oleskiw were influential in redirecting that flow to Canada. He visited an already-established Ukrainian block settlement, which had been founded by Iwan Pylypiw, and met with Canadian immigration officials. His two pamphlets on the subject praised the United States as a place for wage labour, but stated that Canada was the best place for agricultural settlers to obtain free land. By contrast he was fiercely critical of the treatment Ukrainian settlers had received in South America. After his writings, the slow trickle of Ukrainians to Canada greatly increased.

Before the start of the First World War, almost 500,000 Ukrainians emigrated to the Americas. This can be broken down by country as follows:
 to the United States of America: almost 350,000
 to Canada: almost 100,000
 to Brazil and Argentina: almost 50,000

In 1914, the Ukrainian diaspora in the Americas numbered about 700,000-750,000 people, located as follows:

 500,000-550,000 in the United States of America
 almost 100,000 in Canada
 approximately 50,000 in Brazil
 15,000-20,000 in Argentina

Most of the emigrants to the Americas belonged to the Greek Catholic Church. This led to the creation of Greek Catholic bishops in Canada and the United States of America. The need for solidarity led to the creation of Ukrainian religious, political, and social organisations. These new Ukrainian organisations maintained links with the homeland, from which books, media, priests, cultural figures, and new ideas arrived. Furthermore, local influence, as well as influence from their homeland, led to the process of a national re-awakening. At times, the diaspora was ahead of their times in this re-awakening.

Emigrants from the Transcarpathian and Lemko regions created their own organisations and had their own separate Greek Catholic church hierarchy (Ruthenian Catholic Church). These emigrants are often considered to be Rusyns or Ruthenians and are considered by some to be distinct from other Ukrainians. However, in Argentina and Brazil, immigrants from Transcarpathia and the Lemko Region did identify themselves as Ukrainians.

The majority of the Ukrainian diaspora in the Americas focused on freeing the nation and obtaining independence. Thus, during the First World War and the fight for freedom in Ukraine (1919–1920), the Ukrainian diaspora in the United States of America and Canada actively sought to get the governments to support their cause. An interesting note is the role the Ruthenians played to convince the United States' government about the inclusion of the Transcarpathian region into the Czechoslovak Republic in 1919,. The Ukrainian diaspora sent delegates to the Paris Peace Conference.

On the other hand, the Ukrainian diaspora in the Russian Empire, and especially in Asia, was primarily agrarian. After 1860, the diaspora was primarily located in the Volga and Ural Regions, while in the last quarter of that century, due to a lack of space for settlement, the diaspora expanded into Western Siberia, Turkestan, the Far East, and even into the Zeleny Klyn. In the Russian Empire's 1897 census there were 1,560,000 Ukrainians divided as follows:

In the European part of the empire: 1,232,000
In the Volga and Urals: 393,000
In the non-Ukrainian (ethnographically speaking) parts of Kursk and Voronezh Regions: 232,000
Almost 150,000 in Bessarabia.
In the Asian part of the empire: 311,000
In the Caucasus region: 117,000

In the next decades, Ukrainian emigration to Asia increased (almost 1.5 million Ukrainians emigrated), so that in 1914 there were almost 2 million Ukrainians in the Asian part of the Russian Empire. In all of the Russian empire, there was a Ukrainian diaspora of 3.4 million Ukrainians. Most of this population was assimilated due to a lack of national awareness and closeness with the local Russian population, especially in religion.

Unlike the emigrants from Austro-Hungary, the Ukrainian emigrants in the Russian Empire did not create their own organisations nor were there many interactions with their homeland. The revolution of 1917 allowed the creation of Ukrainian organisations, which were linked with the national and political rebirth in Ukraine.

1920–1945

First major political emigration 
The First World War and the Russian Civil War led to the first massive political emigration, which strengthened the existing Ukrainian communities by infusing them with members from political, scientific, and cultural backgrounds. Furthermore, some of these new emigrants formed Ukrainian communities in Western and Central Europe. Thus, new communities were created in Czechoslovakia, Germany, Poland, France, Belgium, Austria, Romania, and Yugoslavia. The largest was in Prague, which was considered one of the centres of Ukrainian culture and political life (after Lviv and Kraków).

This group of emigrants created many different organisations and movements associated with corresponding groups in the battle for independence. A few Ukrainian universities were founded. Furthermore, many of these organisations were associated with the exiled Ukrainian government, the Ukrainian People's Republic.

During the 1920s, the new diaspora maintained links with Soviet Ukraine. A Sovietophile movement appeared, whereby former opponents of the Bolsheviks began to argue that Ukrainians should support Soviet Ukraine. Some argued that they should do so because the Soviet republics were the leaders of international revolution, while others claimed that the Bolsheviks' social and national policies benefited Ukraine. This movement included Mykhailo Hrushevskyi, Volodymyr Vynnychenko and Yevhen Petrushevych. Many émigrés, for example Mykhailo Hrushevskyi, returned and helped the Bolsheviks implement their policy of Ukrainianisation. However, the abandonment of Ukrainianisation, the return to collectivisation and the man-made famine of 1932–33 ended this tendency. Most of the links were broken, with the exception of some Sovietophile organisations in Canada and the United States of America.

On the other hand, the Canadian and American diaspora maintained links with the Ukrainian community in Galicia and the Transcarpathian Region.

The political emigration decreased in the middle 1920s due to a return to the homeland and a decline in students studying at the Ukrainian universities.

Economic emigration 
In 1920–1921, Ukrainians left Western Ukraine to settle in the Americas and Western Europe. Most of the emigrates settled in Argentina, Brazil, Uruguay, Paraguay, France, the UK and Belgium. The economic crisis of the early 1930s stopped most of the emigration. Later, the emigration picked up. The number of emigrants can be approximated as:

to Canada: almost 70,000 Ukrainians;
to Argentina: 50,000 Ukrainians;
to France: 35,000 Ukrainians;
to the United States of America: 15,000 Ukrainians;
to Brazil: 10,000 Ukrainians;
to Paraguay and Uruguay: a couple of thousand Ukrainians.

Furthermore, many Ukrainians left the Ukrainian SSR and settled in Asia due to political and economic factors, primarily collectivisation and the famine of 1920.

Size 

The Ukrainian diaspora, outside of the Soviet Union, was 1.7-1.8 million people, divided by place as follows:

 In the Americas:
 In the United States of America: 700-800 thousand Ukrainians
 In Canada: 250 thousand Ukrainians
 In Argentina: 220 thousand Ukrainians
 In Brazil: 80 thousand Ukrainians
 In Western and Central Europe:
 In Moldova: 358 thousand Ukrainians
 In Poland: 100 thousand Ukrainians
 In France: 40 thousand Ukrainians
 In Yugoslavia: 40 thousand Ukrainians
 In Czechoslovakia: 35 thousand Ukrainians
 In other countries: 15-20 thousand Ukrainians

According to the soviet census of 1926, there were 3,450,000 Ukrainians living outside of the Ukrainian Soviet Socialist Republic, divided as follows:

 In the European part of the Soviet Union: 1,310,000 Ukrainians
 242,000 Ukrainians living on land neighbouring the Ukrainian ethnic territory
 771,000 Ukrainians in the Volga and Ural regions
 In the Asian part of the Soviet Union: 2,138,000 Ukrainians
 861,000 Ukrainians in Kazakhstan
 830,000 Ukrainians in Siberia
 315,000 Ukrainians in the Far East
 64,000 Ukrainians in Kyrgyzstan
 33,000 Ukrainians in the Central Asian Republic
 35,000 Ukrainians in the Caucasus Region.

In Siberia the vast majority of the Ukrainians lived in the Central Asian region and in the Zeleny Klyn. On January 1, 1933, there were about 4.5 million Ukrainians (larger than the official figures) in the Soviet Union outside of the Ukrainian SSR, while in America there were 1.1-1.2 million Ukrainians.

In 1931, the Ukrainian diaspora can be counted as follows:

In the Ukrainian SSR, there were 25,300,278 Ukrainians.

1945–1991

Outside the Soviet Union and Eastern Europe 

After the Second World War, the Ukrainian diaspora increased due to a second wave of displaced persons. The 250,000 Ukrainians at first settled in Germany and Austria. In the latter half of the 1940s and early 1950s, these Ukrainians were resettled in many different countries creating new Ukrainian settlements in Australia, Venezuela, and for a time being in Tunisia (Ben-Metir), as well as re-enforcing previous settlements in the United States, Canada (primarily Toronto, Ontario and Montreal, Quebec), Brazil (specially in the South and Southeast regions), Argentina and Paraguay. In Europe, there remained between 50,000 and 100,000 Ukrainians that settled in the United Kingdom, France, Belgium, and the Netherlands.

This second wave of emigrants re-invigorated Ukrainian organisations in the Americas and Western Europe. In 1967, in New York City, the World Congress of Free Ukrainians was created. Scientific organisations were created. There was created an Institute of Ukrainian Studies at Harvard.

An attempt was made to unite the various religious organisations (Orthodox and Greek Catholic). However, this did not succeed. In the early 1970s, the Ukrainian Orthodox Church in the United States of America and the Ukrainian Autocephalous Orthodox Church in Europe, South America, and Australia managed to unite. Most of the other Orthodox churches maintained with each other some religious links. The Ukrainian Greek Catholic Church had to wait until 1980 until its synod was recognised by the Vatican. The Ukrainian Evangelical and Baptist churches also created an All-Ukrainian Evangelical-Baptist Union.

Within the Soviet Union and Eastern Europe 

During the latter Soviet time there was a strong net migration in the USSR. Most of the Ukrainian contingent that was leaving the Ukrainian SSR for other areas of the Union settled in places with other migrants. The cultural separation from Ukraine proper meant that many were to form the so-called "multicultural soviet nation". In Siberia, 82% of Ukrainian entered mixed marriages, primarily with Russians. This meant that outside the parent national republic there was little or no provision for continuing a diaspora function. Thus only in large cities such as Moscow would Ukrainian literature and television could be found. At the same time other Ukrainian cultural heritage such as clothing and national foods were preserved. According to Soviet sociologist, 27% of the Ukrainians in Siberia read Ukrainian printed material and 38% used the Ukrainian language. From time to time, Ukrainian groups would visit Siberia. Nonetheless, most of the Ukrainians did assimilate.

In Eastern Europe, the Ukrainian diaspora can be divided as follows:

In Poland: 200-300 thousand Ukrainians
In Czechoslovakia: 120-150 thousand Ukrainians
In Romania: 100-150 thousand Ukrainians
In Yugoslavia: 45-50 thousand Ukrainians.

In all these countries, Ukrainians had the status of a minority nation with their own socio-cultural organisations, schools, and press. The degree of these rights varied from country to country. They were greatest in Yugoslavia.

The largest Ukrainian diaspora was in Poland. It consisted of those Ukrainians, which were left in the western parts of Galicia that after the Second World War remained in Poland and had not emigrated to the Ukrainian SSR or resettled, and those who were resettled to the western and northern parts of Poland, which before the Second World War had been part of Germany.

Ukrainians in Czechoslovakia lived in the Prešov Region, which can be considered Ukrainian ethnographic territory, and had substantial rights. The Ukrainians in the Prešov Region had their own church organisation.

Ukrainians in Romania lived in the Romanian parts of Bukovina and the Maramureş Region, as well as in scattered settlements throughout Romania.

Ukrainians in Yugoslavia lived primarily in Bancka and Srem regions of Vojvodina and Bosnia. These Ukrainians had their own church organisation as the Eparchy of Križevci.

Size 
Of the countries where the Ukrainian diaspora had settled, only in Canada and the Soviet Union was information about ethnic background collected. However, the data from the Soviet Union is suspect and underestimates the number of Ukrainians. In 1970, the Ukrainian diaspora can be given as follows:

 In the Soviet Union: officially 5.1 million Ukrainians
 In the European part: 2.8 million Ukrainians
 In the Asian part: 2.3 million Ukrainians
 In Eastern Europe (outside of the Soviet Union): 465-650 thousand Ukrainians
 In Czechoslovakia: 120-150 thousand Ukrainians
 In Poland: 200-300 thousand Ukrainians
 In Romania: 100-150 thousand Ukrainians
 In Yugoslavia: 45-50 thousand Ukrainians
 In Central and Western Europe: 88-107 thousand Ukrainians
 In Austria: 4-5 thousand Ukrainians
 In Germany: 20-25 thousand Ukrainians
 In France: 30-35 thousand Ukrainians
 In Belgium: 3-5 thousand Ukrainians
 In the United Kingdom: 50-100 thousand Ukrainians
 In the Americas and Australia: 2,181-2,451 thousand Ukrainians:
 In the USA: 1,250-1,500 thousand Ukrainians
 In Canada: 581 thousand Ukrainians
 In Brazil: 120 thousand Ukrainians
 In Argentina: 180-200 thousand Ukrainians
 In Paraguay: 10 thousand Ukrainians
 In Uruguay: 8 thousand Ukrainians
 In other American countries: 2 thousand Ukrainians
 In Australia and New Zealand: 30 thousand Ukrainians.

For the Soviet Union, it can be assumed that about 10-12 million people of Ukrainian (7-9 million in Asia) heritage live outside the Ukrainian SSR.

After 1991 
After the independence of Ukraine in 1991, many Ukrainians emigrated to Western countries because of economic depression in the 1990s.

Many Ukrainians live in Russia either along the Ukrainian border or in Siberia. In the 1990s, the number of Ukrainians living in Russia was calculated to be around 5 million. These regions, where Ukrainians live, can be subdivided into 2 categories:
Regions along the mixed Ukrainian-Russian border territory and The Far East  territory:
The northern part of Sloboda Ukraine where Ukrainians have been living for centuries
Siberian Ukrainians
The rest of Russia, formed from systematic migration since the start of the 19th century.
 
Ukrainians can also be found in parts of Romania and Slovakia that border Ukraine.

The size of the Ukrainian diaspora has changed over time due to the following factors:
Growth Factors
New emigration from Ukraine
Natural Growth
Decrease Factors
Returning of emigrants to Ukraine
Assimilation

21st century 

As of 2020, the European Union was host of over half a million Ukrainian citizens, according to official records of residents collected by Eurostat. About half of the Ukrainian citizens in the EU were located in Italy.

On 24 February 2022, Russia launched a large-scale invasion of Ukraine, which has led to millions of Ukrainian civilians moving to neighboring countries. Most have crossed into Poland, and others have gone to Hungary, Moldova, Russia, Slovakia, Romania and other European countries.

Extended statistics

2004 figures 
In 2004, the Ukrainian diaspora was distributed as follows:

Ukrainian diaspora distribution around the world

Communities

Russia

Poland

Finland

Canada

In 2016, there were an estimated 1,359,655 persons of full or partial Ukrainian origin residing in Canada (the majority being Canadian-born citizens), making them Canada's eleventh largest ethnic group and giving Canada the world's third-largest Ukrainian population behind Ukraine itself and Russia.

Italy

Italy has the biggest Ukrainian minority in Western Europe, accounting for more than 230,000 people.

Germany

France

According to official French statistics, there are 220,679 Ukrainians in France as of late 2021.

Spain

According to official Spanish statistics, there are 112,728 Ukrainians in Spain as of late 2019, being the 11th biggest foreign nationality found in Spain.

United Kingdom

List of people of Ukrainian descent
Milton Shulman (1913–2004)
Isidor Zuckermann (d. 1946)
Stefan Kiszko (d. 1993), wrongfully convicted of murder, clerk
Cary Cooper (born 1940), American-born British psychologist
Vernon Bogdanor (b. 1943), scientist, historian
Michael Grade (born 1943) television executive, businessman
Marina Lewycka (born 1946)
Jenny Manson (born 1948), activist, author, former local politician, civil servant
Rafail Turkoniak (born 1949), theologian
Zoë Wanamaker (born 1949), American-British actress
Alexander Beleschenko (born 1951), artist
Richard Desmond (born 1951) publisher, businessman
Cliff Lazarenko (born 1952)
Mick Antoniw (b. 1954), Welsh politician
Narisa Chakrabongse (RTGS: Naritsa Chakkraphong, born 1956), Thai publisher, author, environmental activist
Oliver Letwin (born 1956), Member of Parliament 
Dmytro Morykit (born 1956), composer, pianist
Lisa Beznosiuk (born 1956), musician
Mykola Pawluk (born 1956), video editor
Alexandra Shulman (born 1957), journalist
Taras Kuzio (born 1958 ), academic, expert in Ukrainian political, economic and security affairs
John Daszak, opera singer (debut at The Royal Opera in 1996 and has performed widely in Europe.
Nicola Shulman (b. 1960) biographer, former model
James Marquand (born 1964), movie editor and director
Melinda Simmons, Ambassador of the United Kingdom in Ukraine (since 2019).
Nick Clegg (born 1967), media executive, former politician
Mark Pougatch (born 1968), journalist, author
Charlotte Gainsbourg (born 1971), English-French actress, singer-songwriter.
Gregory Rusedski (born 1973), tennis player
Svitlana Pyrkalo (born 1976), journalist, writer
Natalie Lisinska (born 1982), actress
Alexander Slabinsky (b.1986), tennis player
Alexander Stafford (born 1987), politician
Stepan Pasicznyk (b. 1963), translator, musician
Alison King (born 1973), actress, model
Vera Filatova (born 1982), actress
Darren Dawidiuk (born 1987), rugby player
Jack Lisowski (born 1991), snooker player
Max Kilman (born 1997), footballer
Callum Styles (born 2000), footballer
Olga Kurylenko (born 1979), model, actress

United States

 

According to a 2006 government estimate, there were 976,314 Americans of Ukrainian ancestry.

Brazil

Portugal

 

Ukrainians constituted the second-largest foreign community residing in Portugal, with 44,074 residents in 2012.

Serbia

In Serbia, there are 4,903 (0,08%) ethnic Ukrainians with Serbian citizenship according to the 2011 census. According to the 2002 census there were 5,354 (0,82%) and according to the 1991 census 5,042. Until 1971, Ukrainians and Pannonian Rusyns were counted together.

See also 
 Ukrainian World Congress
 Shevchenko Scientific Society
 Ukrainian Village, Chicago
 Ukrainian Association of Washington State

Notes

References 
 Based on the August 17, 2006 Ukrainian version of the article
 L Y Luciuk, Searching for Place: Ukrainian Displaced Persons, Canada and the Migration of Memory University of Toronto Press, 2001
 Ukraine: A Concise Encyclopaedia. - Toronto, 1971
  Український Науковий Ін-т Гарвардського Ун-ту. Українці в американському та канадійському суспільствах. Соціологічний збірник, за ред. В.Ісаєва. - Cambridge, 1976
  Томилов И. Современные этнические процессы в южных и центральных зонах Сибири. // Советская Этнография, 4, 1978
  Кубійович В. Укр. діяспора в СССР в світлі переписів населення // Сучасність, ч. (210). - Munich, 1978
  Енциклопедія українознавства
 Ukrainian Otherlands. Diaspora, Homeland, and Folk Imagination in the Twentieth Century by Natalia Khanenko-Friesen. 2015. Madison: University of Wisconsin Press. 290 pages. 
 Ukrainian Otherlands: Diaspora, Homeland, and Folk Imagination in the Twentieth Century
 Journal of Folklore Research: JFR Review for Ukrainian Otherlands: Diaspora, Homeland, and Folk Imagination in the Twentieth Century

External links 
 
"Ukrainians abroad have a more developed sense of patriotism..." Zerkalo Nedeli (the Mirror Weekly), November 27 – December 3, 2004. Available online in Russian and in Ukrainian.
 Ukrainian diaspora in Canada and U.S.
 Україна та українське зарубіжжя
 Encyclopedia of Ukraine
 Кобза українці Росії
 Home Ukrainian World Congress | Світовий Конґрес Українців
 Українці за кордоном
 Чисельність українців в США
 Оціночна чисельність українців по країнах світу і перелік мережевих майданів зарубіжжя
 Українці в США - Ukrainians in USA
 Українці в Нью-Йорку - Ukrainians in New York
 The Association of Ukrainians in Great Britain, Edinburgh Branch
 Ukrainians in Bulgaria
 "Byku" - Youth Club of the Ukrainians in Bulgaria
 Ukrainian Institute in London
 Ukrainian Genealogical Research Bureau
 Ukrainian Genealogy and Family History | Library and Archives Canada
 Suggested List of Sources for the Study of Ukrainian Family History
 Top 10 countries of the Western Ukrainian diaspora on its population size and share 
 Top 10 countries of the Eastern Ukrainian diaspora on its population size and share 
 Population size and share of Ukrainians in top 10 European Union Member States 
 Зав'ялов А. В. Соціальна адаптація українських іммігрантів : монографія / А. В. Зав'ялов. — Київ : Саміт-книга, 2020. — 180 с.

 
Ukrainian-American history
Foreign relations of Ukraine
Ukrainian studies
European diasporas